Lucius Appuleius (fl. 4th century BCE) was a man of ancient Rome who served as Tribune of the Plebs in 391 BCE. He impeached Marcus Furius Camillus for having secreted part of the spoils of war against the rival Etrurian city of Veii in 406.

See also
Appuleia gens

References

Lucius
5th-century BC Romans
4th-century BC Romans
Tribunes of the plebs
Date of birth unknown
Date of death unknown